Adolph Stöhr (February 24, 1855 – February 10, 1921) was professor of philosophy at the University of Vienna. His lectures and publications covered subjects such as logic, metaphysics, philosophy of language, experimental psychology, psychology of perception, and psychology of association.

Publications 
 Philosophische Konstruktionen und Reflexionen 1974 (posthumous)
 Lehrbuch der Logik in psychologisierender Darstellung 1910
 Philosophie der unbelebten Materie 1907
 Zur Hypothese der Sehstoffe und Grundfarben 1898
 Die erste Volkshochschule 1965 (posthumous)
 Letzte Lebenseinheiten und ihr Verband in einem Keimplasma, vom philosophischen Standpunkte ... 1897
 Philosophie der unbelebten Materie: Hypothetische Darstellung der Einheit des Stoffes und seines ... 1907
 Zur nativistischen Behandlung des Tiefensehens 1892
 Umriss einer Theorie der Namen 1889

References 
 D. Angetter: "Stöhr Adolf." In: Österreichisches Biographisches Lexikon 1815–1950. Band 13, Verlag der Österreichischen Akademie der Wissenschaften, Vienna 2007–2010, p. 291ff.

Austrian logicians
Epistemologists
Metaphysicians
Philosophers of language
1921 deaths
1855 births
Academic staff of the University of Vienna